Wakeford is an English surname. Notable people with the surname include:

Christian Wakeford (born 1984), British MP for Bury South
Edward Wakeford (1894–1916), English geometer
Jim Wakeford (born 1944), well-known medical marijuana advocate based in Toronto, Canada
John Wakeford (died 1930), Church of England clergyman convicted of adultery and deprived of his post in 1921
Kent L. Wakeford (1928–2020), American cinematographer, co-founder of two commercial production companies
Richard Gordon Wakeford KCB OBE LVO AFC (1922–2007), officer in the Royal Air Force for 36 years, from 1941 to 1977
Richard Wakeford VC (1921–1972), English recipient of the Victoria Cross during World War II
Tony Wakeford (born 1959), English folk and neoclassical musician who primarily records under the name Sol Invictus

See also
Wakeford Nunatak, small nunatak 6 km east of the Central Masson Range in the Framnes Mountains, Mac. Robertson Land
Jake Ford
Wake Forest (disambiguation)
Wesford
Wexford

English-language surnames